Duomo is an underground metro station on line 1 of the Naples Metro. It opened on 6 August 2021.

It is located near Naples Cathedral, after which it is named.

Designed by the Italian architect Massimiliano Fuksas, the station is located at a central roundabout in Corso Umberto I (Rettifilo), with secondary entrances along Via Marina and Via Duomo.

See also
 List of Naples metro stations

Naples Metro stations
Railway stations in Italy opened in the 21st century